Sandee is both a given name and surname. Notable people with the name include:

 Jan Sandee (1919–2011), Dutch economist
 Sandee Chan (born 1970), Taiwanese singer-songwriter, music producer and director 
 Sandée (1962–2008), American freestyle music vocalist
 SanDeE, character from L.A. Story

See also 
 Sandy (disambiguation)